Sarah Day (born 1958) is an English-born Australian poet and teacher.  She was also the poetry editor of Island Magazine for several years.

Biography

Sarah E Day was born in Lancashire, England, in 1958 and grew up in Hobart, Tasmania.  After obtaining a degree from University of Melbourne, she then taught English at Devonport and Hobart school. Along with the subject she and taught Creative Writing at a college level. She was also one of the head members of the Literature Fund of the Australian Council, along with becoming the poetry editor at Island Magazine for many years. Day had started her poem publishing journey in the early 1980s, her pieces are featured in the Westerly, Quadrant and Island Magazine routinely. Since her first novel, she has six other collections, along with a volume of New and Selected Poems. 

In 2002, Days' New and Selected Poems was published by Arc in the UK, being the same place where it received Special Commendation by the Poetry Book Society. She was a recipient of grants from the Literature Fund of Australia Council and Arts Tasmania. She was welcomed to the Festival de Poesie in Paris both in 2001 and 2004. She also was invited and appeared at Australian festivals like Adelaide, Melbourne and Mildura, etc. Her first novel A Hunger to Be Less Serious was written into four sectors which included poems Voices from Titree, Fountain Blue, Anemones and Hawk.  

Bibliography

 A Hunger to Be Less Serious (1987), (winner of the Anne Elder Award for the first volume of poetry)
 A Madder Dance (1992)
 Quickening  (1997)
 Easter Train (2000)
 New and Selected Poems(2002)
 The Ship (2004) Brandl & Schlesinger, Blackheath NSW 
 Grass Notes (2009) Brandl & Schlesinger, Blackheath NSW 
 Tempo (c.2013) Puncher and Wattman, Glebe NSW 
 Mussolini's Island (2017) Tinder Press, London 
 Towards Light & Other Poems (2018) Puncher and Wattman, Glebe NSW 

Awards and recognition
Day's 2004 book, The Ship'', won the Queensland Premier's Award and Judith Wright Calanthe Award for poetry (2005), and the University of Melbourne Wesley Michelle Wright Prize (2004)).

References

External links
 Official website
 Sarah Day Poems

Australian women poets
English women poets
English emigrants to Australia
1958 births
Living people